Protestants in Myanmar make up 3% of that nation's population, many of them Baptists. Most Christians are from the minority ethnic groups such as Karen, Lisu, Kachin, Chin, and Lahu. An estimated 0.1 per cent of the Bamar population is Christian.

History 
Protestant Christianity in Myanmar began in the early 19th century, largely through the missionary efforts of the Americans Adoniram and Ann Judson, Baptist missionaries who first arrived in 1813. Later missionaries such as Arthur and Laura Carson, also Baptist missionaries from America, established work in the Chin Hills in 1899. By the 1920s, missionaries of the Assemblies of God brought Pentecostalism to the northern parts of modern-day Myanmar, among the Lisu people; Lisu evangelists would continue to spread Pentecostalism among the Kachin and, since the 1970s, among the Chin.

In 1966 all missionaries were expelled by the Burmese government. Protestantism is strongest among minority ethnic groups, often juxtaposed against the Bamar majority ethnic group who tend to be Buddhists.

Denominations 
Baptists, Assemblies of God, Methodists and Anglicans form the strongest denominations in Myanmar.

Anglicanism
The Anglican Communion is represented in Burma by the Church of the Province of Myanmar. , it has about 62,000 members.

Baptist
The Myanmar Baptist Convention is an association of Baptist churches in Myanmar.

The famous American Baptist missionaries, Adoniram and Ann Judson, moved to Yangon in 1813 when British authorities refused to allow them to stay in India. The Judsons were in Burma six years before their first convert was baptised. Adoniram Judson gathered a group of believers and laboured under many trials, but his missionary tenure of almost 40 years helped firmly establish the Baptist work in Myanmar. His monumental work included translating the Bible into Burmese, which was completed in 1834. George Dana Boardman began a work among the Karen peoples in 1828. Today the Karen Baptist Convention is the largest member body of the Myanmar Baptist Convention, which was formed in 1865.

HIV/AIDS is a significant problem in Myanmar. In 1992, the Baptist Convention created a 32-member AIDS commission, because they see the problem as spiritual, as well as social and medical.

In Myanmar about 6% of the population is Christian, with two-thirds of them being considered Protestant. Almost half of these Protestants are Baptists. In 2012, the Convention had over 1.6 million members in 4929 churches. The Myanmar Baptist Convention has 18 affiliated conventions and two directly affiliated local churches under its umbrella, and is a member of the World Council of Churches and the Baptist World Alliance.

During 5–8 December 2013 Myanmar Baptist Convention celebrated its 200th anniversary arrival of missionary Judson. They are actively planning to evangelise all the unreached people groups of it and plant as many as 1200 churches in their project entitled: Golden Myanmar Baptist Mission, Second Decade(2014-2024).

The Convention operates the Myanmar Institute of Theology, the leading Christian seminary in Myanmar, founded in 1927 and located in Insein.

Methodist Church

Methodist missionaries entered the country along with the British once Myanmar became a British colony in the late 1800s. Methodists established, similarly to the Anglicans, schools in the country, most notably the Methodist English High School in Yangon, mostly to educate the Anglo-Burmese and British. The school exists to this day and today is known as Dagon State High School but still attached the Methodist Church.

The United Methodist Church works with the Lower Myanmar Methodist Church which was founded by American Methodist missionaries over 100 years ago. The Upper Myanmar Methodist Church was planted by British Methodists. The two are in discussion about merging. They already conduct joint missions.

The Lower Myanmar Methodist Church began under the British. The Lower Myanmar Methodist Church concentrates on leadership development through scholarships and continuing education. It also provides a home for the elderly, helps youth develop job skills, cares for orphans and provides environmental education.

Christian Reformed Church in Myanmar

The Christian Reformed Church in Myanmar is a Reformed church of Myanmar, and was founded in 1985 by Pastor Chan Thleng who was former ordained in the Presbyterian Church in Myanmar. He belongs to the Matu tribe in Southern Chin State born in 1954 become Christian in 1974. In 1985 he founded the United Christian Church after he graduated from Calvin Theological Seminary in Grand Rapids, MI he returned to Burma and changed the denominations name to the Christian Reformed Church. It has 52 congregations and 13 preaching points with more than 6,000 members. The church is divided into 10 Classes. Most of the evangelists work among Buddhist and Animist people. The church is divided into classes. The Church recognises the Belgic Confession, Heidelberg Catechism, Canons of Dort and the Ecumenical Creeds. To train pastors the church founded the Reformed Theological seminary in Yangon in 1997. The college offers a degree of Bachelor of Theology. The Christian Reformed Church maintains a clinic opened in 1999 in Matupi. It belonged to the Reformed Ecumenical Council, the only Burmese denomination to do so. But REC merged with the World Alliance of Reformed Churches, now the Christian Reformed Church is affiliated with the World Communion of Reformed Churches. The denomination held its 26th General assembly in 17–20 March 2011. It entered into official ecclesiastical fellowship with the Christian Reformed Church in North America in 2011.

Presbyterian Churches 

 Reformed Presbyterian Church in Myanmar
 Evangelical Presbyterian Church in Myanmar
 Presbyterian Church in Myanmar
 Reformed Evangelical Church in Myanmar
 United Reformed Church in Myanmar
 Independent Presbyterian Church in Myanmar
 Free Reformed Church of Myanmar
The biggest church is the Presbyterian Church in Myanmar with 30,000 members and 300 parishes and hundreds of house fellowships.

Mara Evangelical Church 

The Mara Evangelical Church is one of the oldest church in Chin State. It was founded by English missionaries, Rev. Reginald Arthur Lorrain and his wife, in 1907. The church has 100 congregations and 17,200 members, and it is affiliated with the World Communion of Reformed Churches.

True Jesus Church in Myanmar

The True Jesus Church is a nontrinitarian Christian denomination begun in China, growing out of the Pentecostal movement. Since its foundation it has spread to other countries including Myanmar.

As of 2000, there are two churches, one in Taungphila and Pyindaw Oo, and prayer houses in six different areas: Pyidawtha, Sakhamayi, Tiddicm, Falam, Nud Kyi Kone, and Yangon Shwebogan. The number of believers is 211.

See also
 Christianity in Myanmar
Lisu Church
 Myanmar Institute of Theology
 Roman Catholicism in Myanmar
 True Jesus Church in India

Further reading
 Schendel, Jörg. "Christian missionaries in Upper Burma, 1853–85." South East Asia Research (1999): 61-91. in JSTOR
 Latourette, Kenneth Scott.  Christianity in a Revolutionary Age, Vol. V: The twentieth century outside Europe: the Americas, the Pacific, Asia, and Africa : the emerging world Christian community (1962) pp 339–42
 Latourette, Kenneth Scott.  A history of expansion of christianity. 3. Three centuries of advance: A.D. 1500-A.D. 1800 (1939) pp 293–94
 Latourette, Kenneth Scott.  A history of the expansion of Christianity. 6, The great century in Northern Africa and Asia: A.D. 1800 - A.D. 1914 (1944), pp 225–35
 Latourette, Kenneth Scott.  A history of expansion of Christianity. 7. Advance through storm: AD 1914 and after (1945), pp 319–23
 Neill, Stephen. A History of Christian Missions (Penguin Books, 1986), pp 293, 347, 417, 477-8.
 Wardin, Jr., Albert W. Baptists Around the World
 Encyclopedia of Southern Baptists, Norman W. Cox, editor
 Womack, William. "Contesting Indigenous and Female Authority in the Burma Baptist Mission: the case of Ellen Mason." Women's History Review 17.4 (2008): 543-559.
 Crossman, EileenMountain Rain, OMF 1982. A biography of Fraser with much details on the early mission among the Lisu in China

References

External links 

 Christianity in Burma
 Pentecostalism in Burma

 
Myanmar